Ricardo Teixeira (born 1947), former president of the Brazilian Football Confederation.

Ricardo Teixeira may also refer to:

Ricardo Teixeira (racing driver) (born 1984), Angolan-Portuguese racing driver
Ricardo Teixeira (footballer) (born 2001), Portuguese footballer